The women's team pursuit competition at the 2018 UEC European Track Championships was held on 2 and 3 August 2018.

Results

Qualifying
The eight fastest teams advanced to the first round.

First round
First round heats were held as follows:
Heat 1: 6th v 7th fastest
Heat 2: 5th v 8th fastest
Heat 3: 2nd v 3rd fastest
Heat 4: 1st v 4th fastest

The four fastest qualifiers were placed in heats 3 and 4, while the next four were placed in heats 1 and 2. 
The winners of heats 3 and 4 qualify for the gold medal race, while the two fastest remaining teams, regardless of heat, progress to the bronze medal race.

 QG = qualified for gold medal final
 QB = qualified for bronze medal final

Finals

References

Women's team pursuit
European Track Championships – Women's team pursuit